Al-Quds University is a Palestinian university with its main campus in Abu Dis and additional campuses in al-Bireh, Hebron and Jerusalem.

Overview

The idea of establishing an institution of higher learning in the outskirts of Jerusalem was conceived early in 1957, when a board of trustees was formed
in Kuwait. The board elected an executive committee entrusted with bringing the project into being. The committee entrusted Rouhi al-Khatib, the mayor of East Jerusalem, with the task of assisting the executive committee in its endeavors and to initiate construction work, which began in 1965. Nevertheless, a sizable section of the buildings on the campus was completed later and used as a primary and secondary school, servicing mostly Palestinian orphans.

Its founding constituent colleges included the colleges of Science and Technology, Paramedical Sciences, Arts and Religious Studies. Its School of Medicine, associated with the city's Makassed Hospital, was the first college to be founded directly under the banner of Al-Quds in 1993 and is the first Palestinian medical school, For facts, the base of Al-Quds University started in Abu-Dis, when the university started. The People of Abu Dis Village donated the land where the Abu Dis (Al-Quds main Campus) located now.

Al-Quds is governed by a board of trustees. The founding board was headed by Mohammed Nusseibeh and included Grand Mufti of Jerusalem Sheikh Ikrema Sabri, Adnan al-Husayni, Saeb Erekat, and others as members. The first president, Hatem Husseini, was followed by president, Sari Nusseibeh then the current president .

The university provides higher education and community services in the Jerusalem area and to the neighboring towns, villages and refugee camps in the West Bank. It has 10 academic faculties on four campuses: Arts, Science and Technology, Medicine, Dentistry, Public Health, Law, Qur'an and Islamic Studies, Health Professions, Engineering, and Jurisprudence. These faculties accommodate more than 6,000 students from the Jerusalem area and from the districts of Bethlehem, Hebron, Jenin, Jericho, Nablus, Ramallah, Tulkarem, and Qalqilia. The university maintains two Jerusalem campuses and administrative offices in the American Colony and in Beit Hanina. Since the Second Intifada many classes have been moved to Abu Dis. Other campuses operate in al-Bireh next to Ramallah and Tubas.

Partnerships

Brandeis University

Brandeis University and Al Quds enjoyed sister institution status between 1998, when Jehuda Reinharz of Brandeis and Sari Nusseibeh formalized the ´Brandeis-Al-Quds Partnership´, and 2013. Cooperation and institution building was intended to be a fundamental part of this partnership. In 2008 and 2009 Brandeis and Al Quds students met in Istanbul as part of the Brandeis-Al-Quds Summer Institute to discuss the theoretical concept of a ´good society´ through literature, political documents, and travel journals. In May 2009, a Brandeis delegation of four undergraduates and eight faculty members visited Al Quds University to strengthen the partnership and explore future cooperation.

The relationship was ended in 2013 following a demonstration at Al Quds and a widely criticized response from the Al Quds University administration.

Bard College

In February 2009, Bard College announced the first dual degree program between a Palestinian university and an American institution of higher education. The college entered into a collaboration with Al-Quds University involving an honors college, a masters program in teaching and a model high school. Among its programs, faculty teach in Media Studies, Human Rights, Literature, Urban Studies, Biology, Computer Science, Chemistry, Economics, and Political Science.

Many students also get the chance to go on an exchange program for a semester or two to Bard or any of its different partners as well as many other universities. Students of Al-Quds Bard College can get the chance to participate the exchange programs of Al-Quds University and not only the program of Al-Quds Bard. Bard College also welcome exchange students from multiple universities in the world.

Students of Al-Quds bard College will gain two certificates for their bachelor's degree, one certificate from Bard New York College in United States, and the other one from Al-Quds University. Students of Al-Quds Bard College can register for courses in Al-Quds university and the courses will be equalized and approved in Bard College's system.

Israeli West Bank barrier 

Al-Quds University, where Al-Quds Bard is located, started in 1984. But as for the Israeli West Bank barrier, it was built in 2004. Therefore, after the university has already been established and education is in the making for students, the barrier had affected its students studies when being made by the Israeli forces.
Due to the occupation and having the wall face the students in the university daily, clashes have occurred within the years. Students have been injured and many of the students studying at the university have faced tear gas and some students have been shot. The students at Al-Quds Bard have each witnessed these clashes or have faced tear gas because it is one of the nearest buildings towards the gate. In these situations, the students stay in the building with the doors closed in order for gas not to enter.

Liberal Arts
Al-Quds Bard College is the only liberal arts education in Palestine, giving students the opportunity to improve their skills in different academic divisions without limitation to a student's particular major. This produces students with a high level of general culture, better analytical and critical thinking skills, and improved presentation and debating skills. Teaches them to read closely different texts. Students also improve their writing skills regardless of their major, as for they take different writing and reading based courses in their first two years, such as English and Arabic courses, First Year Seminar (FYSEM), and Second Year Seminar (SYSEM). Most of the courses do not have a midterm and final exams but essays, projects, and presentations. For the first two years, students do not have a major in AQB, as for they take different requirements and distribution courses.
 
Moreover, AQB follows the Harkness table teaching method, as for, students set around a table, this method encourages students to think outside the box, and provides students with an open-minded environment for discussions and learning.

Moderation
Moderation is a mandatory process in Al-Quds Bard College. Moderation typically takes place in the fourth or fifth semester, as a way of choosing a major. Conditions vary from department to department and most require the completion of a certain set or a certain number of courses. To moderate, the student presents whatever work is required to a moderation board of three professors and is subsequently interviewed, examined, and critiqued. In AQB, mostly the process of moderation in most programs consists of writing three main paper; one is a critical evaluation of the experience in the past two years, the second one about the plan for the upcoming two years, and the last one is a revised paper from a class in the field that one seeks to moderate in.

Writing Center
A center that provides students with help in their academic papers through reviewing them and suggesting possible improvements. Students go to the Writing Center for the purpose of improving their thoughts and writing. Writing center at AQB also holds different useful workshops for students in different academic matters, in which students learn how to correctly form a thesis, how to correctly structure essays, avoid common mistakes, it also provides them with the ability to distinguish between formal and informal languages, and provides students with help in their senior projects.

Academy for Global Justice 
In 2018, Al-Quds University launched the Al-Quds Academy for Global Justice, an institute that will focus on teaching, training, and research in the areas of international criminal law and human rights. Among the speakers at the academy's launch event was Luis Moreno Ocampo, the first Prosecutor of the International Criminal Court, who will chair the academy and teach courses there. Palestinian Justice Minister Ali Abu Diak also delivered a speech at the event.

Bard's Core Courses
 
Language and Thinking
 This course is preceding the students' first semester, it is an intensive three weeks long course. Its objective is to introduce first-year students to the liberal arts education through different theoretical texts that allow them to have a critical analysis of those texts. Thus, helping them to write creatively.

First Year Seminar, Second Year Seminar, English Composition, and Arabic Composition courses.
 Students are expected to read closely different ranges of literature, and philosophy in order to engage with them by writing different types of essays and debating them in class.

Junior Writing and Research Seminar 
 Students are expected to write their Senior thesis by the end of Junior Year.

Programs
Biology

This program consists of experimental and theoretical fields. Students are required to take courses in every field of biology that are known as core-requirements. It consists of cellular, molecular, organismal, and environmental biology that helps teach students about the living world and basic life processes. The students are taught how to approach biology from different and various viewpoints. When a student studies biology, he/she has to take courses such as bio-chemistry and organic chemistry in order to connect both subjects together.

Chemistry

This program consists of experimental and chemical theoretical fields. Students spend considerable time taking organic chemistry courses because they are needed in order to become well-aware of the biology and chemical fields in which they are both inter-related. This is why biochemistry is a core requirement for chemistry and biology students. Students become more aware of biological processes, environmental changes, and industrial innovations.

Computer Science

This program consists of basic ideas of theories and applications. It focuses on the vital ideas of computer science and various programming languages. The students are taught how to get involved in direct engagement with the courses and research projects that are carried out in the laboratory. Computer science is related to cognitive science, electronic arts, mathematics, and physics. Students become familiar with the information in industrial, commercial, government, and university environments.

Social Sciences
Political Science

This program consists of critical reasoning and deep- thought discussions. It acquires a wide range of debates, reasoning, and participation in any context of Political Science. Also, it focuses on political and global public affairs in which students become more aware about on a local, national, and international level. Students are taught how to explore various fields of politics all over the world.

Human Rights and International Law

This is the first program that's offered in Palestine. It focuses on teaching students the fundamental meaning of human rights. The whole point of this program is to make students aware of how they are given a unique ability to pursue change in their environment and in external areas. The concept of human rights is essential to influence a change in the world. Also, students become aware of how to defend their own rights as well as other's rights in order to bring peace. Students go through a process of how to justify their arguments in a strong and efficient matter.

Economics

This program concentrates on theoretical approaches to the fundamental principles of Economics. Students are initially required to take Into. to Micro-Economics and Intro. to Macro-Economics and even a mathematical course if needed. The introduction courses are a basic need if one wants to pursue Economics as a major or minor, because the role of the economy is explained in these two courses. It also teaches students how to engage with their economy with the sustainable amount of knowledge needed.

Urban Studies and Spatial Practices

This program is a connection between urban areas and its interactions with the social organization of society. It involves the study of other fields and their engagement with the spatial area. Students are taught how to explore how spatial areas have a significant impact on the people of society and how their interaction can effect the urban area itself and its people. Many experiences are given to the students such as physical activities and direct actions with the urban spaces. This is a study that involves being put in the middle of an area and learning how to engage with it.

Humanities and Practicing Art
Literature and Society

This program focuses on defining the types of Literature by studying the scholar's analysis, novels, and history of each community by looking at and defining the relationship between literature and the race, gender, equality, human rights, and class. This makes the students be aware about the activities that happens around them in a descriptive and detailed sense. Studying Literature and Society makes the students able to clarify and compare the periods of movements and to categorize them into forms and genres. This program expects students to know the methodological tools that are used and to know how to re-write and classify analytical papers while formulating the skills that will make them enter this profession easily in the Middle East and abroad.

Media Studies

The Media Studies Program includes how the students learn about the "meaningful" digital media and how can people use it in a way that satisfies the natural needs of people and the way they express them. In this program, students become able to think critically of the influence that the Media has on us and the community around us. Documentary, screen writing, broad casting, and blogging are some aspects and skills that students learn. Even though the student could specialize in one skill of using media, he/she should take courses in history, literature, and other courses in order to be able to succeed in his/her career of choosing Media Studies as a major or minor. Other fields help contribute to the study of Media in a positive way as the same way that Media contributes to other fields of studies. Media can help students to learn how to freely express themselves using various ways of images and videos.

Masters in Arts of Teaching

The main aim for the Masters Program in Bard College is to change the public way of education. The Masters' graduates teach the students how to be self-determined, and to develop their thoughts. Finishing the master's degree from Al- Quds Bard results in gaining two degrees, one from Bard in New York and the other from Al-Quds Bard in Palestine. This Masters Program contains five different programs (Mathematics, English, Biology, History and Science.) It also teaches the potential teachers how to have a critical reflection on the known ways of teaching and how to be creative in delivering the messages that they have.

See also
 
:Category:Al-Quds University alumni
List of Palestinian universities
Education in the Palestinian territories

References

External links

 
Official website 
IT Center
E-Class

Universities and colleges in Jerusalem
Al-Quds University
Jerusalem